Panulirus gracilis, the green spiny lobster, is a crustacean species described by Thomas Hale Streets 1871. Panulirus gracilis is part of the genus Panulirus and the Palinuridae family . IUCN categorizes the species globally as insufficiently studied. No subspecies are listed in the Catalog of Life.

References

External links

Achelata
Crustaceans described in 1871
Taxa named by Thomas Hale Streets